Ziaire Williams (born September 12, 2001) is an American professional basketball player for the Memphis Grizzlies  of the National Basketball Association (NBA). He played college basketball for the Stanford Cardinal.

Early life
Williams was born in Lancaster, California as the only child of Ziaire Williams and Marquita Fields-Williams. He began playing basketball at age five and was training under the guidance of his father by age eight.

High school career
For his first three years of high school, Williams attended Notre Dame High School in Sherman Oaks, Los Angeles. In his freshman season, he averaged 13.6 points and 6.5 rebounds per game. Williams missed much of his sophomore season with an injury but saw success in the summer with his club team BTI Select. On January 14, 2019, as a junior, he was named Los Angeles Daily News boys athlete of the week following two consecutive games with at least 34 points. In his junior season, Williams averaged 27 points, 10 rebounds, and three assists per game. He earned All-Mission League first team and USA Today All-USA California second team honors.

On July 18, 2019, Williams transferred to Sierra Canyon School in Chatsworth, Los Angeles for his senior year. He joined the team with fellow five-star recruit BJ Boston, as well as Bronny James and Zaire Wade, the respective sons of basketball players LeBron James and Dwyane Wade. Williams was not eligible to play until December 29, due to CIF Southern Section (CIF-SS) transfer rules, and missed more than 10 games. In his season debut, he scored 28 points in an 85–81 overtime loss to Rancho Christian School. On March 11, 2020, Williams scored 17 points and made a buzzer-beater in a 63–61 comeback win over Etiwanda High School. As a senior, he averaged 15 points, 7.9 rebounds and 3.6 assists per game, helping Sierra Canyon win the CIF-SS Open Division title. He was named player of the year by the Los Angeles Times. Williams was selected to play in the McDonald's All-American Game, Jordan Brand Classic and Nike Hoop Summit, but all three games were canceled due to the COVID-19 pandemic.

Recruiting
Williams was a consensus five-star recruit and the number one small forward in the 2020 recruiting class. On April 12, 2020, he announced his commitment to Stanford over Arizona, USC, North Carolina and UCLA. Williams became Stanford's highest-ranked recruit in the modern recruiting era and the program's first five-star recruit since Reid Travis in 2014.

College career
In his collegiate debut for Stanford on November 30, 2020, Williams scored 19 points and grabbed eight rebounds in an 82–64 win against Alabama. On January 7, 2021, he recorded 12 points, 12 rebounds and 10 assists, the first triple-double by a Stanford player since 2007, in a 91–75 victory over Washington. As a freshman, Williams averaged 10.7 points, 4.6 rebounds and 2.2 assists per game, shooting 37.4 percent from the field. On March 31, he declared for the 2021 NBA draft, forgoing his remaining college eligibility.

Professional career

Memphis Grizzlies (2021–present) 
On July 29, 2021, Williams was selected with the tenth overall pick in the 2021 NBA draft by the New Orleans Pelicans, then traded to the Memphis Grizzlies. After missing 14 consecutive games due to an ankle injury and a stint in the NBA’s COVID–19 protocols, Williams got his first career start on January 6, 2022, recording 14 points and two steals in a 118–88 win over the Pistons. On February 2, Williams set a career-high with 21 points in a 120–108 win over the New York Knicks. He then tied that record on February 24, in a 114–119 loss to the Minnesota Timberwolves. During the first round of the playoffs, the Grizzlies faced the Timberwolves. Williams made his playoff debut on April 16, scoring four points in a 117–130 Game 1 loss. The Grizzlies ended up winning the series in six games, but were eliminated during the second round by the Golden State Warriors in six games.

Williams missed the first 24 games of the 2022–23 season with a right knee injury. He made his season debut on December 7, recording four points, six rebounds, three assists and two steals in a 123–102 win over the Oklahoma City Thunder.

National team career
Williams played for the United States at the 2019 FIBA Under-19 Basketball World Cup in Heraklion, Greece. In seven games, he averaged 5.3 points and 1.2 assists per game, helping his team win the gold medal.

Career statistics

NBA

Regular season

|-
| style="text-align:left;"| 2021–22
| style="text-align:left;"| Memphis
| 62 || 31 || 21.7 || .450 || .314 || .782 || 2.1 || 1.0 || .6 || .2 || 8.1
|- class="sortbottom"
| style="text-align:center;" colspan="2"|Career
| 62 || 31 || 21.7 || .450 || .314 || .782 || 2.1 || 1.0 || .6 || .2 || 8.1

Playoffs

|-
| style="text-align:left;"| 2022
| style="text-align:left;"| Memphis
| 10 || 1 || 16.8 || .442 || .306 || .923 || 1.6 || .5 || .5 || .0 || 6.9
|- class="sortbottom"
| style="text-align:center;" colspan="2"| Career
| 10 || 1 || 16.8 || .442 || .306 || .923 || 1.6 || .5 || .5 || .0 || 6.9

College

|-
| style="text-align:left;"| 2020–21
| style="text-align:left;"| Stanford
| 20 || 14 || 27.9 || .374 || .291 || .796 || 4.6 || 2.2 || .9 || .6 || 10.7

Personal life
Both of Williams' parents have served in the military: his mother, Marquita Fields-Williams, in the Army and Air Force, and his father, Ziaire Williams, in the Marine Corps. His mother is a probation officer, and his father works for 7 Up in Sylmar, Los Angeles.

References

External links
Stanford Cardinal bio
Sierra Canyon Trailblazers bio
USA Basketball bio

2001 births
Living people
American men's basketball players
Basketball players from California
McDonald's High School All-Americans
Memphis Grizzlies players
New Orleans Pelicans draft picks
People from Lancaster, California
Sierra Canyon School alumni
Small forwards
Sportspeople from Los Angeles County, California
Stanford Cardinal men's basketball players